Operation: Secret Santa — A Prep & Landing Stocking Stuffer is a computer-animated short film sequel to 2009's Christmas special Prep & Landing, produced by Walt Disney Animation Studios, and directed by Kevin Deters and Stevie Wermers-Skelton. The short premiered on TV channel ABC on Tuesday, December 7, 2010. The second half-hour Christmas TV special, Prep & Landing: Naughty vs. Nice aired on December 5, 2011, on ABC.

Plot 
Wayne and Lanny, now partners, are called by Magee to meet with a secret contact – Mrs. Claus, who sends them on a new mission to retrieve a box from Santa's secret workshop. Later they sneak into Santa's office while he is asleep, using their high tech equipment from the previous film. Lanny's expertise at dressing the tree enables them to enter the hidden workshop where they recover the box and escape just in time. Mrs. Claus reveals the contents of the box to be the last part of the first toy that Santa ever made, and gives the complete toy (a wooden duck on wheels) back to him as his Christmas Present.

Cast 
 Derek Richardson as Lanny
 Dave Foley as Wayne
 Sarah Chalke as Magee
 Betty White as Mrs. Claus
 W. Morgan Sheppard as Santa Claus (credited as "The Big Guy")

Release 
Prep & Landing: Operation: Secret Santa aired on TV channel ABC on Tuesday, December 7, 2010.

The short was released on the Prep & Landing DVD on November 22, 2011, accompanying the original special and the short film Tiny's Big Adventure. It was also released on DVD and Blu-ray of Prep & Landing: Totally Tinsel Collection on November 6, 2012, together with Prep & Landing, Naughty vs. Nice, and Tiny's BIG Adventure. 
It was released on the Walt Disney Animation Studios Short Films Collection Blu-ray on August 18, 2015.

See also 
 List of Disney Animated Shorts and Featurettes
 Walt Disney Animation Studios

References

External links 

 
 

2010 television films
2010 films
2010 short films
2010 computer-animated films
2010s Disney animated short films
2010s Christmas films
American Christmas films
Christmas television specials
Computer-animated short films
American Broadcasting Company television specials
Films scored by Michael Giacchino
Emmy Award-winning programs
American Christmas television specials
Santa Claus in film
2010s English-language films
Films directed by Kevin Deters